Abdel Rahim Alhassane Bonkan (born 1 January 2002), known as just Rahim Alhassane, is a professional footballer who plays as a right-back for Primera Federación club Rayo Majadahonda. Born in Nigeria, he plays for the Niger national team.

Club career
Rahim Alhassane began his career in Spain with Paracuellos Antamira in 2020, before signing with Rayo Majadahonda in January 2021. On 1 September 2021, he signed on loan with Gimnástica Segoviana in the Segunda División RFEF.

International career
Born in Nigeria, Rahim Alhassane is of Nigerien descent. He debuted with the Niger national team in a 1–1 2023 Africa Cup of Nations qualification tie with Tanzania on 4 June 2022.

References

External links
 
 
 
 Gimnástica Segoviana profile

2002 births
Living people
Sportspeople from Lagos
People with acquired Nigerien citizenship
Nigerien footballers
Niger international footballers
Nigerian footballers
Nigerian people of Nigerien descent
Association football fullbacks
CD Paracuellos Antamira players
CF Rayo Majadahonda players
Gimnástica Segoviana CF footballers
Primera Federación players
Segunda Federación players
Tercera Federación players
Nigerien expatriate footballers
Nigerien expatriate sportspeople in France
Nigerien expatriate sportspeople in Spain
Nigerian expatriate footballers
Nigerian expatriate sportspeople in France
Nigerian expatriate sportspeople in Spain
Expatriate footballers in France